Snær is a personification of snow in Norse mythology. Notable people with the name include:

Given name
Andri Snær Magnason (born 1973), Icelandic writer
Elliði Snær Viðarsson (born 1998), Icelandic handballer
Hilmir Snær Guðnason (born 1969), Icelandic actor
Ísak Snær Þorvaldsson (born 2001), Icelandic footballer
Sturla Snær Snorrason (born 1994), Icelandic alpine skier
Styrmir Snær Þrastarson (born 2001), Icelandic basketball player

Surname
Albert Snaer (1902–1962), American jazz trumpeter
Louis Snaer (died 1917), American politician from Louisiana
Michael Snaer (born 1990), American basketball player